Kanpai!, or , is a Japanese manga by Maki Murakami. Originally published by Sony Magazines, its two volumes were published in English by Tokyopop. Although Kanpai! is the title officially acknowledged by Tokyopop and used on the covers and the Tokyopop title page (as opposed to the original title page by Murakami, which is also used), only kimi no unaji ni kanpai! is used in the book itself in all other instances.

Sony Magazines published the manga first tankōbon volume under the Birz Comics imprint in March 2001. The first volume was republished and a second volume was released by Gentosha on December 24, 2001. Tokyopop released the series on September 13 and December 13, 2005. The series was republished into a "special ban" on December 24, 2011 and follow-up, Kimi no Unaji ni Kanpai! R, was published on June 23, 2012.

Characters

 He is a monster guardian in-training, as monsters are nearly extinct and overhunted by mankind. He carries a squared timber as a weapon, and was raised by Ponta-san. Shintarou shows up at the Taino Municipal Middle School one day as a new student, claiming to be Brazilian (which fails to explain his native Japanese name and firm grasp of the language) but the first thing the other students notice about him is that he perfectly matches the description of a murderer in that morning's newspaper—which is completely correct; Shintarou had killed an exorcist the night before in defence of a werewolf. He sees Nao's nape and soon falls in love…but with her nape, not Nao herself. In volume two, it is revealed that Shintarou seems to be half vampire- and half human. He seems to live in a mountainous area of Tokyo with his father (who is apparently staying temporarily).

Ponta
 He is a talking rabbit. He was charged by Shintarou's father to raise him and help him earn his temporary guardian's licence by killing three hundred exorcists.

Nao Arisaka
 She is a typical, spoiled, beautiful girl. Incredibly narcissistic, she is pined for by almost every male (teachers included) in the school, and delights in crushing their hopes. She later becomes Shintarou's "meal for life" after he bites her neck and sucks her blood to revive himself after being killed by Sakurai Miko.

Akiko Nakamura 
 She is Nao's best friend, and apparently has powerful brainwaves that can pick up the supernatural. She seems to suffer from anemia, and faints at times of high excitement. She eventually gains a strong friendship with Miko's ceremonial spirit, and can call him to her aid.

Kenken
 He is the werewolf Shintarou saved. He is caught by an exorcist eating a girl he had just killed, and would have died without Shintarou's help. The exorcist later comes after Shintarou and Nao as a zombie. The werewolf appears and holds him still, commanding Shintarou to run them both through with his timber—which he does without any hesitation, to the disgust of Nao and the exorcist. The shock of the werewolf's death transferred his soul to the exorcist's body. Shintarou dubs him "Kenken-kun" and he begins attending middle school with Nao and Shintarou (although the exorcist's body looks to be in its twenties).

Yabe
 He is a ghost. He first appears hostile, as he goes to extremes to keep Shintarou from Nao. He lingered on because of his unrequited love for her. She eventually grants the desire keeping him from moving on—acknowledging him as an equal being by calling his name. However, instead of going to heaven, he somehow returns to his human body and begins attending school again. He seems to have trouble holding onto his body, though; he is often killed again and barely manages to return to his flesh in time.

Papa
 Shintarō's father. He is a full vampire and an apparent womanizer. He is determined to have Sakurai Miko as his wife after he defeats her and drinks her blood. He seems rough with his son, though seems to care enough about him to come to his aid.

Noriko Kuroma
 Short, hyperactive, and paranoid she is a deranged girl who is known as the president of the Occult SF Sorcery Investigation Club. She draws a magic Square to drag the supposed ‘demon’ out of Shintarou and actually releases his true vampire form.

Mysterious Exorcist
 He is a Yuki from Gravitation look alike, but has a mere difference of a ponytail. His name is speculated to be Zin (or Jin as Zi- is translated into J from Japanese) but it is unmentioned in the manga. He appears to be after Yamada’s father but accidentally runs into Shintarou himself. It is unknown the reason why he allows Shintarou to live, and ends up fighting against Papa Yamada.

Further reading

References

External links
Kanpai! at Tokyopop

2000 manga
Fantasy anime and manga
Gentosha manga
Madman Entertainment manga
Seinen manga
Tokyopop titles
Vampires in anime and manga
Anime and manga about werewolves